Macross The Ride or Macross R is a light novel series published in the Dengeki Hobby Magazine, a Japanese model kit magazine. It is based on the Macross sci-fi mecha series. It was serialized from December 2010 until November 2011.

Plot
The plot of the light novel is set in an air race competition performed using advanced civilian "valkyries" (variable fighters) in the massive space emigration colony ship Macross Frontier in the year 2058 A.D., one year before the events of the Macross Frontier anime television series. Many designs from the different Macross series also appear in this novel.

Production
Original Macross creator and mecha designer Shoji Kawamori performed editorial supervision of the novel. Ukyō Kodachi, who was in charge of the novelization of Macross Frontier, wrote the new novel series. Famous mecha illustrator Hidetaka Tenjin created graphic art adapted from Varchi Lee's new variable fighter model kit designs. Muneharu designed the color schemes of the new variable fighters and other mecha shown in the magazine. The character designer for the new novel series was Katsumi Enami. Tommy Otsuka was in charge of the illustration of the web adaptation of the novel.

The new models of plastic model kits shown in the hobby magazine were sponsored and manufactured by Hasegawa and Bandai. Garage kits were converted and customized for the new plastic model designs and were manufactured from scratch for the hobby magazine. Dengeki published submitted fan-based garage kits of various variable fighters.

A book summarizing the light novel episodes was published on June 25, 2011. Also a visual book with photos of the new models published in the magazine was released with the novel.

A limited sale kit of the VF-11D "Thunderfocus" variable fighter which appeared in the light novel was produced as a plastic model kit from Hasegawa in December 2011.

Episodes
Deep Space Warbird
Up, up and Away
Spiral Blue
City Fight Step
Virtual Sky
Iron Maiden
Past Days Attacker
Combat Open
Piece Children
Fascas
Try Again
Final Rap

References

External links
Macross R official Website

Book series introduced in 2010
2010 Japanese novels
Macross
Light novels